Ernestown railway station in Loyalist, Ontario, Canada is a Heritage Railway Station, also protected under Part IV of the Ontario Heritage Act.

History
The Ontario Heritage Act designation notes that the station is "one of only nine first-generation Grand Trunk Stations surviving of thirty-four stations built along the line in an Italianate style that had already become associated with railway buildings in Britain in the 1840s".

References

Designated heritage railway stations in Ontario
Designated heritage properties in Ontario
Railway stations in Lennox and Addington County
Grand Trunk Railway stations in Ontario